The Rashtriya Janasachetan Party is a political party in West Bengal, India. Badal Debnath is the founding president of the party. The party claims to uphold the ideals of Swami Vivekananda, Gandhi and Subhas Chandra Bose. The party fielded four candidates in the 2011 West Bengal Legislative Assembly election, whom together mustered 3,001 votes.

References

Political parties in West Bengal
Political parties with year of establishment missing